Hokiang,  was a province in Northeast China, which was established in 1945. It was c.52,300 sq mi (135,500 km²) in size and the provincial capital was Jiamusi.

History

Medieval history
From 698 to 936, the Mohe-ruled kingdom of Balhae (Bohai) occupied northern Korea and parts of Northeast China and Primorsky Krai, consisting of the Nanai, the Udege, and the Evenks and descendants of the Tungus-speaking people and the people of the recently fallen Goguryeo kingdom. Hejiang  settled at this moment by Northern Mohe tribes were submitted to Balhae Kingdom under King Mun and reign King Seon's reign (818-830) :
 Funie Mohe (拂涅靺鞨) were located on the south between Hejiang Province and Songjiang Province
 Tieli Mohe (鐵利靺鞨) on the west of Hejiang Province
 Heishui Mohe (黑水靺鞨) roughly between the north of Hejiang Province (Shuangyashan, Jiamusi, Hegang and Yichun) and the south of actual Khabarovsk Krai (Bikin, Vyazemsky, Lazo and Khabarovsk neighbourhood).

King Seon administrated their territories by creating three prefectures :
 Dongping (Dongpyeong) Prefecture (東平府)
 Yizhou (Iju) (伊州), present-day Mishan as its administrative centre, corresponding to the previous land of the Funie Mohe
 Dingli (Cheolli) Prefecture (定理府)
 Delizhen (Deongnijin) (德理鎮) present-day Harbin, as its administrative centre, corresponding to the previous land of the Tieli Mohe
 Huaiyuan (Hoewon) Prefecture (懷遠府)
Dazhou (Dalju) (達州) present-day Tongjiang, as its administrative centre  corresponding to the southern part of the Heishui Mohe territory

Balhae was an early feudal medieval state of Eastern Asia, which developed its industry, agriculture, animal husbandry, and had its own cultural traditions and art. People of Balhae maintained political, economic and cultural contacts with the Tang dynasty, as well as Korea and Japan.

Modern history
The province was formed in 1945 after the capture of Japanese controlled Manchukuo.  In 1949, the province was incorporated into the Songjiang Province and in 1954 the whole area was included into the Heilongjiang Province.

See also

References

Provinces of the Republic of China (1912–1949)
History of Manchuria
States and territories disestablished in 1949